John Warrington (born 25 October 1962 in London) is a TV producer and director specialising in live sports production and sports documentaries. He also presented a number of sports programmes including the Masters Football highlights show for Channel 4. Perhaps his best known documentary film is Hatton Mayweather: The Full Story, which was released in 2008. In 2021, he founded sports documentary platform 360 Sports TV along with former England international footballer, Tony Woodcock, which in February 2022 announced it was rebooting Masters Football after an 11 year absence. He also produced and directed the first 360 Sports TV original film, The Burmese Python, about professional boxer Nicola Barke which was released on boxing day 2021.

References

External links
John Warrington at IMDb

1962 births
Living people